When Lanes Merge (Traditional Chinese: 情越雙白線) is a 2010 TVB modern drama series.

Synopsis 
Rushing along the road every day with a vibrant mix of passengers of all kinds, what taxi drivers see and hear is far more varied than one can ever imagine. Retired taxi driver Ho Kau (Kent Cheng) returns to the job after his son Ho Ka-po (Raymond Wong) was convicted for causing death by dangerous driving under the influence of alcohol. The incident has exacerbated the already fractious relationship between both father and son. Ho Ka-po works for Ho Kau after his release from prison. Before long, he has another serious road accident, in which Ho Kau is also involved and severely injured, both mentally and physically. Ho Ka-po feels so guilty towards his father and comes to understand the importance of careful driving. He maintains a high degree of vigilance while driving but still gets picked on constantly by female traffic police officer Ko Lai-Sam (Kate Tsui). As time goes by, the pair have gradually developed a strong attachment to each other and finally become lovers. But Ho Ka-po's ex-girlfriend Cheung Hiu-Man (Sonija Kwok) and Ko Lai-Sam's grandmother Ko Li Shuk-Ching (Lee Heung Kam) turn out to be the biggest obstacle to their relationship, leaving the pair stranded in dismay along the tunnel of love.

Cast

The Ho Family

The Ko Family

The Cheung Family

The Au family

The Ngai family

Other cast

Awards and nominations
TVB Anniversary Awards (2010)
 Nominated: Best Drama
 Nominated: Best Actor (Kent Cheng)
 Nominated: Best Supporting Actress (Kingdom Yuen)
 Nominated: Best Supporting Actress (Elaine Yiu)
 Nominated: My Favourite Male Character (Kent Cheng)
 Nominated: My Favourite Male Character (Raymond Wong)
 Nominated: Most Improved Actor (Raymond Wong)
 Nominated: Most Improved Actress (Elaine Yiu)

Viewership ratings

International Broadcast
  - 8TV (Malaysia) 31 October 2012

References

External links
TVB.com When Lanes Merge - Official Website 

TVB dramas
2010 Hong Kong television series debuts
2010 Hong Kong television series endings